Gowdara Mallikarjunappa Institute of Technology is an engineering and Technology college in Davangere, Karnataka. The college was established by the Srishaila Educational Trust owned by the GM Family, Bheemasamudra.

It is located in the outskirts of Davangere city, the geological centre of Karnataka state. The college is situated  beside  Poona - Bangalore Road, National Highway NH 4.

The College is spread over 46 acres of land, at a distance of 4 km from Davangere city.

Disciplines

Undergraduate programmes
The college provides four years full time Bachelor of Engineering (B.E) degrees in the following streams:
Bio-Technology
Civil Engineering
Computer Science and Engineering
Electronics and Communication Engineering
Information Science and Engineering
Mechanical Engineering
Also
B Pharmacy

Three-year BBM & B.Sc are also available.

Postgraduate programmes
M.Tech in Digital Electronics
M.Tech in Machine Design
M.Tech in Bio informatics
MBA (HR & Finance)

Diploma courses
Civil Engineering
Mechanical Engineering

Besides B.E programs, the college also provides a two-year full time Master of Business Administration degree and it also houses a pre-university college.

References

Engineering colleges in Karnataka
Affiliates of Visvesvaraya Technological University
Education in Davangere
Universities and colleges in Davanagere district
Educational institutions established in 2001
2001 establishments in Karnataka